Shanghai M&G Stationery Inc., doing business as M&G Stationery, is a stationery company headquartered in the Guangming Economic Zone, Fengxian District, Shanghai, China.

The company was established in 1997. It was originally known as Shanghai Sino-Korean M&G Stationery Manufacturing Co., Ltd.. Its products include pens, erasers, glue, drawing materials, schoolbags, markers, highlighters, mechanical pencils, notebooks, correction fluid, oil pastels, sticky notes, pencil leads, and pen refills. The pens sold by the company include ballpoint, gel, and roller varieties. Its annual business volume is about 2 billion renminbi.

The company has a Singaporean subsidiary, M&G Stationery Pte Ltd.

References

External links
 
  
  M&G Stationery
 M&G Singapore
 "晨光文具的渠道驱动力" (Archive). 163.com Money section. 2009-04-18.
 "晨光：小文具做出大企业" (Archive). 163.com Money section. 2010-06-17.
 "上海晨光文具股份有限公司招聘法务专员" (Archive). Peking University Intellectual Property Law School.

Chinese brands
Office supply companies of China
Manufacturing companies based in Shanghai
Chinese companies established in 1997
Companies listed on the Shanghai Stock Exchange